Josephina Maria Allegonda de Groot (born 22 January 1966), known as Marie-José de Groot, is a Dutch rower. She competed in the women's double sculls event at the 1992 Summer Olympics.

References

External links
 

1966 births
Living people
Dutch female rowers
Olympic rowers of the Netherlands
Rowers at the 1992 Summer Olympics
People from Someren
Sportspeople from North Brabant